The Greater Changhua Offshore Wind Farms are a series of offshore wind farms currently under construction off coast of Changhua County, Taiwan.

History
The project was approved by the Environmental Protection Administration in February 2018 and is owned by Ørsted. The approval for Ørsted to connect the wind power to Taiwan electrical grid was granted in April 2018. The construction for the 900 MW wind farms began with the onshore construction for Changhua 1 and Changhua 2A wind farms in November 2019. The first turbines sent electricity to the grid in April 2022, and completion is expected for year's end. A coral growth program tests ability to mitigate coral bleaching.

Technical specifications
The proposed wind farms consists of four wind farms, which are Changhua 1, Changhua 2A, Changhua 2B and Changhua 4. Changhua 1 has a capacity of 605 MW and will be located in a water depth of 34.4–44.1 meters across an area of 108.7 km2. Changhua 2 has a capacity of 295 MW.

See also
 Renewable energy in Taiwan
 Wind power in Taiwan
 Electricity sector in Taiwan

References

Buildings and structures in Changhua County
Buildings and structures under construction in Taiwan
Wind farms in Taiwan